The traditional Welsh poetic meters consist of 24 types of poetic meter, called Y Pedwar Mesur ar Hugain in Welsh. They are all written in cynghanedd of varying degrees of complexity.

Although called "traditional," they were compiled – and later redefined at least once – in the Late Middle Ages and omit some of the older forms such as the englyn milwr. Only a few of them were widely used by the professional poets (Beirdd yr Uchelwyr), and the use of some of the more complicated ones is confined to occasional poems of technical virtuosity dating to the end of the Middle Ages.

The twenty four traditional Welsh poetic meters are:
Awdl-gywydd
Byr-a-thoddaid
Cadwynfyr
Clogyrnach
Cyhydedd Fer
Cyhydedd Hir
Cyhydedd Naw Ban
Cyrch-a-chwta
Cywydd Deuair Fyrion
Cywydd Deuair Hirion: see Cywydd
Cywydd Llosgyrnog
Englyn Proest Cyfnewidiog
Englyn Proest Cadwynog
Englyn Unodl Crwca
Englyn Unodl Union
Gorchest Beirdd
Gwawdodyn Byr
Gwawdodyn Hir
Hir-a-thoddaid
Rhupunt Byr
Rhupunt Hir
Rhupunt Hwyaf
Tawddgyrch Cadwynog
Toddaid

See also
Welsh poetry
Welsh literature
Eisteddfod

Notes
 

Medieval Welsh literature
Welsh-language literature
Welsh poetry
Poetic rhythm